Dombeya is a flowering plant genus. Traditionally included in the family Sterculiaceae, it is included in the expanded Malvaceae in the APG and most subsequent systematics. These plants are known by a number of vernacular names which sometimes, misleadingly, allude to the superficial similarity of flowering Dombeya to pears or hydrangeas (which are unrelated). Therefore, the genus as a whole is often simply called dombeyas. The generic name commemorates Joseph Dombey (1742–1794), a French botanist and explorer in South America, involved in the notorious "Dombey affair", embroiling scientists and governments of France, Spain, and Britain for more than two years.

Distribution
These plants grow chiefly throughout Africa and Madagascar. Madagascar has the majority of species, with approximately 175 native species. 19 are found on the African mainland, with one, Dombeya torrida, also extending into the southwestern Arabian Peninsula. 24 species are native to the Mascarene Islands, of which 23 are endemic to the islands. Dombeya acutangula is native to east Africa, Madagascar, and the Mascarenes, with a disjunct population in Laos in Southeast Asia.

Taxonomy
Formerly believed to hold only about 80 species, in the present delimitation, Dombeya is one of the most speciose Malvaceae genera, containing as many as 255 species. Most have been moved here from distinct genera, which are now considered junior synonyms. Some of these might warrant recognition as subgenera, to show the evolutionary and phylogenetic patterns of the numerous dombeyas more clearly. In addition to the synonyms listed here, Astiria is suspected to be a rather distinct derivative of Dombeya and would thus have to be included in the present genus. This requires renaming of species, as A. rosea conflicts with D. rosea, a junior synonym of D. burgessiae. Furthermore, several species have been moved here from related genera that are still valid, namely Pentapetes.

Dombeya of L'Héritier de Brutelle is a synonym of Tourrettia (Bignoniaceae). Dombeya of Lamarck is a synonym of Araucaria.

Selected species
There are 203 accepted species of Dombeya. Selected species include:

 Dombeya acerifolia Baker (= D. acerifolia var. typica Hochr.) Madagascar
 Dombeya acuminatissima Hochr. eastern Madagascar.
 Dombeya acutangula  Cav. – Bois Bete, mahot tantan. East Africa (Tanzania to Mozambique), Madagascar, Mascarene Islands, and Laos.
 Dombeya aethiopica Gilli Ethiopia
 Dombeya albisquama Arènes central-eastern Madagascar
 Dombeya albotomentosa Arènes central Madagascar
 Dombeya alleizettei Arènes central Madagascar
 Dombeya amaniensis Engl. Tanzania
 Dombeya ambalabeensis Arènes southwestern and southern Madagascar
 Dombeya ambatosoratrensis Arènes central-eastern Madagascar
 Dombeya ambohitrensis Arènes northern Madagascar
 Dombeya ambositrensis Arènes central Madagascar
 Dombeya ameliae Guill. east-central Madagascar
 Dombeya amplifolia Arènes central-eastern Madagascar
 Dombeya anakaensis Arènes southwestern Madagascar
 Dombeya andapensis Arènes central and eastern Madagascar
 Dombeya andrahomanensis Arènes southern Madagascar
 Dombeya angustipetala Arènes eastern Madagascar
 Dombeya ankaratrensis Arènes central Madagascar
 Dombeya ankazobeensis Arènes central Madagascar
 Dombeya anonyensis Arènes central Madagascar
 Dombeya antsianakensis Baill. central and eastern Madagascar
 Dombeya apikyensis Arènes southeastern Madagascar
 Dombeya aquifoliopsis Hochr. eastern Madagascar
 Dombeya asymmetrica Appleq. Madagascar
 Dombeya australis Scott-Elliot southeastern Madagascar
 Dombeya autumnalis I.Verd. Northern Province of South Africa
 Dombeya baronii Baker central and eastern Madagascar
 Dombeya bathiei Hochr. central Madagascar
 Dombeya befotakensis Arènes eastern Madagascar
 Dombeya bemarivensis (Hochr.) Arènes central Madagascar
 Dombeya biumbellata Baker central Madagascar
 Dombeya blattiolens Frapp. ex Cordem. Réunion
 Dombeya boehmiana (= Vincentia boehmiana (F.Hoffm.) Burret)
 Dombeya borraginea Hochr. western Madagascar
 Dombeya breonii Appleq. Central and eastern Madagascar
 Dombeya brevistyla Arènes Central and eastern Madagascar
 Dombeya buettneri K.Schum. tropical Africa from Guinea to Ethiopia and Zambia
 Dombeya burgessiae Gerrard ex Harv. (= D. greenwayi Wild, D. mastersii Hook.f., D. parvifolia K.Schum., D. rosea E.G.Baker, D. tanganyikensis Baker) South Sudan to Angola and South Africa
 Dombeya cacuminum Hochr. northern and central Madagascar
 Dombeya ciliata Cordem. Réunion
 Dombeya coria Baill. central and eastern Madagascar
 Dombeya cymosa Harv. southern Mozambique to South Africa
 Dombeya decanthera Cav. (= D. bojeriana Baill., Melhania decanthera (Cav.) DC) southeastern Madagascar
 Dombeya delislei Arènes. Réunion
 Dombeya elegans Cordem. – sometimes included in D. burgessiae. Réunion
 Dombeya ferruginea Cav. (= Pentapetes ferruginea Poir.) Mauritius, Réunion
 Dombeya ferruginea ssp. borbonica F.Friedmann 
 Dombeya ferruginea ssp. ferruginea
 Dombeya ficulnea Baill.  – sometimes erroneously included in D. punctata. Réunion
 Dombeya formosa Le Péchon & Pausé Réunion
 Dombeya glandulosissima Arènes eastern Madagascar
 Dombeya kirkii Mast. southern Ethiopia to KwaZulu-Natal
 Dombeya laurifolia (Bojer) Baill. (= D. parkeri Baill., D. valimpony R.Vig. & Humbert, D. valimpony f. obovalopsis Hochr., Melhania laurifolia Bojer) central Madagascar
 Dombeya leandrii Arènes western Madagascar
 Dombeya ledermannii Engl. Nigeria and Cameroon
 Dombeya longebracteolata Seyani southwestern and southern Ethiopia
 Dombeya macrantha Baker (= Andringitra macrantha (Baker) Skema) central Madagascar
 Dombeya mauritiana F.Friedmann Mauritius
 Dombeya montana (Hochr.) Arènes (= D. acerifolia var. montana Hochr.) central Madagascar
 Dombeya palmatisecta Hochr. Madagascar
 Dombeya pilosa Cordem. Réunion
 Dombeya populnea Baill. (= Pentapetes populnea Poir.) Mauritius, Réunion
 Dombeya pulchra N.E.Br. South Africa: Northern Province to KwaZulu-Natal
 Dombeya punctata Cav. (= D. lancea Cordem., D. pervillei Baill., Pentapetes punctata Poir.) Réunion
 Dombeya reclinata Cordem. Réunion
 Dombeya rodriguesiana F.Friedmann Rodrigues
 Dombeya rottleroides Baill. northern and central Madagascar
 Dombeya rotundifolia (Hochst.) Planch. – Blompeer or "South African Wild Pear". Southern Ethiopia to South Africa
 Dombeya sevathianii Le Péchon & Baider Mauritius
 Dombeya shupangae K.Schum. southeastern Kenya to Mozambique and Democratic Republic of the Congo
 Dombeya spectabilis Bojer (= D. chapelieri Baill., D. humblotii Baill., D. lantziana Baill., D. rotundifolia Bojer) east-central Madagascar
 Dombeya tiliacea (Endl.) Planch. (= Xeropetalum tiliaceum Endl.) South Africa: Eastern Cape Province to KwaZulu-Natal
 Dombeya torrida (J.F.Gmel.) Bamps Central African Republic to Eritrea, Zambia, and Malawi; also Yemen and southwestern Saudi Arabia.
 Dombeya tsaratananensis (Hochr.) Arènes (= D. ficulnea var. tsaratananensis Hochr.) central Madagascar
 Dombeya umbellata Cav. (= Pentapetes umbellata Poir.) Réunion
 Dombeya wallichii (Lindl.) K.Schum. (= Astrapaea wallichii Lindl.) – Pink-ball, "Tropical Hydrangea". Eastern Madagascar

Footnotes

References
  (2006): Does minimizing homoplasy really maximize homology? MaHo: A method for evaluating homology among most parsimonious trees. C. R. Palevol 7(1): 17–26.  (HTML abstract)
  (2008): Partial Synonymy of Dombeya. Retrieved 2008-JUN-25.

External links
 malvaceae.info: Dombeya gallery. Retrieved 2008-JUN-25.
 PlantList search for Dombeya. Retrieved 20190318.

 
Malvaceae genera
Dombeyoideae
Taxonomy articles created by Polbot
Afrotropical realm flora
Taxa named by Antonio José Cavanilles